is an anime series based on the Finnish novel Paimen, piika ja emäntä (The Shepherd, the Servant Girl, and the Hostess) by Auni Nuolivaara. The series was broadcast originally in Japan in 1984 as part of the children's anthology series World Masterpiece Theater, also known simply as "Meisaku from Nippon Animation. The anthology had before and after produced a great variety of animated series based on different children's novels from around the world; among them were My Annette: Story of the Alps (1983) and Little Princess Sara (1985). In Europe, where World Masterpiece Theater series have found huge success, Katri, Girl of the Meadows made its way to different countries, including Spain, Italy, France, Netherlands, Germany, and the Arabic-speaking world. Despite the series taking place in Finland, it has never been published or broadcast there, and most Finns have never heard of it.

The first and last episodes were broadcast English dubbed in the UK on Channel 4 as Little Girl on the Farm and Little Girl goes to School as part of 1987's Japanese Autumn season.

Plot
Settled in  Finland, the plot starts in 1911 when little Katri's mother left for Germany to work, leaving her daughter with her grandparents. At the beginning of First World War, With Finland still under Russian rule, the inhabitants of these lands have had little or no news from the outside, and no one knows if Katri will see her mother again, whose money meanwhile stops arriving to the family. To make matters worse, things on Katri's grandparents' farm are not going well; the harvest had been a small one, their only cow had been killed by a bear and the family confronts great monetary problems.

Katri wants to help and, against her grandparents' will, she finds work in a neighboring farm; for a girl of hardly nine years of age the work of a farm is hard and tiring even with all of her enthusiasm and good moods, which is what keeps her standing. The little girl will meanwhile knows the Kalevala by the old Gunilla and learn reading and writing thank her.

Later, Katri works as a nanny for a wealthy child, whose mother will send her to school in Turku, with a great success for Katri in studying thank how Gunilla helped her in getting ready. The child will also know how the Russian Revolution and the war will lead to independence of Finlnand from Russia.
At the end of the war, Katri's mother comes back to find the daughter, who, once adult, will work writing stories for children.

Cast
Hitomi Oikawa as Katri Ukonniemi
Toru Furuya as Martti
Yuko Tsuga as Mari (Martti's sister)
Yuko Kobayashi as Helena (Martti's cousin)
Yoshiko Matsuo as Miina (Helena's mother)
Mahito Tsujimura as Väinö Harma
Asami Mukaidono as Milole (Harma's maid)
Kumiko Takizawa as Lotta Kuusela
Hisashi Katsuta as Elias Lilack (Lotta's father)

Anime
The opening theme is "Love With You" and the ending theme is "Kaze no Komoriuta", both by Chie Kobayashi.

References

External links
 Makiba no Shōjo Katori Nippon Animation 
 

1984 anime television series debuts
1984 Japanese television series endings
Adventure anime and manga
Drama anime and manga
Historical anime and manga
World Masterpiece Theater series
World War I television series
Television shows set in Finland
Fictional farmers
Fictional Finnish people
Fuji TV original programming
Television shows set on farms
Works based on Finnish novels